Trapania gibbera is a species of sea slug, a dorid nudibranch, a marine gastropod mollusc in the family Goniodorididae.

Distribution
This species was first described from Nivani Island, Louisiade Archipelago, Papua New Guinea. The original description also includes specimens from Bali and Okinawa. A specimen from Lizard Island, Queensland is probably this species.

Description
This goniodorid nudibranch is opaque white in colour. The oral tentacles are translucent orange and the rhinophores and gills are edged with the same colour. There is a dark brown bar across the front of the head between the oral tentacles.

Ecology
Trapania gibbera probably feeds on Entoprocta which often grow on sponges and other living substrata.

References

External links
 

Goniodorididae
Gastropods described in 2008